József Kiss (19 March 1748 – 13 March 1813) was a Hungarian hydrotechnical engineer. He is best known for his work as the architect of the Great Bačka Canal, an important hydrotechnical and transport structure in the Bačka region of modern-day Serbia and Hungary. Architects built upon his ideas and incorporated the canal into the Danube-Tisa-Danube Canal system.

Early life 
Kiss was born in Buda on 19 March 1748, into a family of military officers that obtained noble status in 1681 with the last name Kissarosi. Together with his brother Gabor he graduated from the military academy in Vienna. In 1768, after completing his education there, he went to Great Britain to study the construction of its canal systems.

Career 
Returning to Habsburg Hungary, he was appointed as a military engineer. Soon after, in the 1770s, he abandoned military service to become a civil engineer working for the Hofkammer, the main financial institution of the Habsburg monarchy. His first duty was regulating the water level of the Danube near Bratislava. He later transferred to the outskirts of Vienna. Records mention him as a clerk of the Hofkammer around 1780. In 1782, Joseph II initiated a migration from the southeastern regions of Germany to the area surrounding the Podunavlje, hoping to provide a stable economic situation for the migrating German population. At the same time, Kiss first arrived in Vojvodina. However, a serious water supply problem arose and threatened the migration efforts; the southern edge of the Telek Highlands were covered with morasses, marshes and bogs, and east of Vrbas lay the Crna bara (English: "black pools"), a water catchment area. Those areas were natural habitats for malaria-bearing mosquitoes. Much of the migrating population became infected, which seriously hampered settlement efforts. This problem could be solved through drainage of the marshy areas, which would eliminate the mosquitoes' breeding grounds.

In 1785, Kiss proposed that a ditch, one meter in width, be dug between Kula and Vrbas to drain the area. The following year, another channel was dug between Vrbas and Sivac, also overseen by Kiss.

In 1787, as soon as the Sivac - Vrbas channel was completed, he analyzed the terrain between the Danube and Tisza, and determined a 7.27 meter elevation difference between the two rivers. He believed that this would allow for the creation of a canal between them, that would run through the Crna bara.

In 1788, the Hofkammer appointed Kiss as the lead engineer for Bačka (Dirigirender Hofkammer—Ingenieur), with responsibilities including supplying lumber to the military and facilitating navigation through the region’s waterways.

In the meantime, his younger brother Gabor had arrived in Bačka to help József with construction of the Great Bačka Canal, staying there to assist until he was called to serve in the military.

Canal 

The Kiss brothers submitted an application to Leopold II, which in one part stated:

In 1792, they received the license to build the canal and formed an association with 800,000 forints of seed capital. The association was called The Privileged Hungarian Shipping Society. The work on the canal started in spring of 1793 under the supervision of József Kiss. 

During the time, the government was involved in several wars. Despite this, construction of the canal continued. A shortage of laborers further slowed progress. Estimates were around 2000 at the beginning of the project, decreasing over time. Although the monarchy had promised 4000 soldiers for the project, only two regiments were sent, which constructed barracks and scanned the transverse profiles of the foundation pits for the lock and channel sections. Slovak soldiers, arriving from Bačko Gradište undertook many of the same duties. Later, about 500 convicts were brought to the site and forced to work in harsh conditions. Since the convicts were poorly dressed and badly fed, their performance suffered accordingly, and so they were later withdrawn. Confronted with the worker shortage, Kiss placed job notices around the territory. 

Challenges arose during the first year of work on the Monoštor lock. The high water pressure of the Danube caused water to flow in the working pit and create sludge. Freshly built slopes frequently collapsed, and substantial groundwater flow into the work pits caused further problems.

However, the work continued, and after four years, the waterway became navigable to the point of Mali Stapar.

In 1796, an anonymous tip informed the association that the canal was behind schedule and over budget. Despite Kiss’ explanations, he was expelled from the association and stripped of all authority. Kiss and his brother had invested heavily in the project, and his expulsion led to his and his brother’s financial ruin.

Stanislav Hepe was appointed to replace Kiss, and continued the project from 1797 to 1801.

When finished in 1802, the Danube - Tisza channel had reached the length of 110 kilometers.  This length is cited on all maps published after the completion of the channel. As a result, the voyage from Bezdan to the Tisa was shortened by 258 kilometers. This saved about 10 days on a downstream journey, and 20 on an upstream journey.

The stimulus that commerce, manufacturing and navigation received influenced the increased development of nearby settlements such as Apatin, Sombor, Crvenka, Kula, Vrbas, Srbobran and Bečej.  An important function of the channel was also melioration, especially east of Vrbas, as much of the wide, marshy terrain around the banks of the canal was drained and turned into fertile soil.

Epilogue 

Stripped of all functions in the association, Kiss returned to his job as the leading engineer for Bačka. When he finally retired after 42 years of work, he received only a quarter of his pension from the Hofkammer, which was about 312 forints annually. The other three quarters were garnished in order to repay debts that he incurred after his expulsion from the association. He built a summer house near Vrbas, which he called Josephsruhe (English: “József's peace”). He spent the rest of his life there, until his death on 13 March 1813, and was buried nearby.

Kiss’ notebook, titled Stammbuch and written in German and Latin contains entries about his family and work, along with sketches of famous historical figures such as Maria Theresia, Joseph II, and Napoleon Bonaparte. On the last page, he had sketched a desired gravestone and epitaph which reads:

Legacy 

As the creator of one of the first major hydrotechnical works in the area surrounding the Podunavlje, Kiss laid the foundations for an expansion of hydrotechnical construction in the hydrographically complex region of Bačka.

References 

Engineers from Budapest

1748 births
1813 deaths
People from Buda